The  Arizona Cardinals season was the franchise's 99th season, 78th season in the National Football League and the 10th in Arizona. The team was unable to match their previous output of 7–9, instead winning only four games. The Cardinals failed to qualify to the playoffs for the fifteenth consecutive season.

In week 2, the Cardinals ended a 13-game losing streak to the Dallas Cowboys.

Offseason

NFL Draft

Undrafted free agents

Personnel

Staff

Roster

Regular season

Schedule

Standings

References 

Arizona Cardinals seasons
Arizona Cardinals
Arizona